"Si" is a song by French singer-songwriter Zaz, released  as a single from the 2013 album Recto Verso.

Chart positions

References

2013 songs